When a work's copyright expires, it enters the public domain. The following is a list of works that enter the public domain in 2018. Since laws vary globally, the copyright status of some works are not uniform.

Entering the public domain in countries with life + 70 years
With the exception of Belarus and Spain (which is Life + 80 for creators who died before 1987), a work enters the public domain in Europe 70 years after the creator's death, if it was published during the creator's lifetime. The list is sorted alphabetically and includes a notable work of the creator that entered the public domain on January 1, 2018. For previously unpublished material, those who publish it first will have the publication rights for 25 years.

Entering the public domain in countries with life + 50 years
In most countries of Africa and Asia, as well as Belarus, Bolivia, Canada, New Zealand and Uruguay; a work enters the public domain 50 years after the creator's death.

Entering the public domain in Australia

In 2004 copyright in Australia changed from a "plus 50" law to a "plus 70" law, in line with America and the European Union. But the change was not made retroactive (unlike the 1995 change in the European Union which bought some e.g. British authors back into copyright, especially those who died from 1925 to 1944). Hence the work of an author who died before 1955 is normally in the public domain in Australia; but the copyright of authors was extended to 70 years after death for those who died in 1955 or later, and no more Australian authors will come out of copyright until 1 January 2026 (those who died in 1955).

Entering the public domain in the United States

The Copyright Term Extension Act means no published works would enter the public domain in this jurisdiction until 2019. Only unpublished works whose authors died in 1947 enter the public domain.

On January 26, 2018, Ludlow Music, the music publisher for We Shall Overcome, agreed in a legal settlement that the song is in the public domain.

On February 27, 2018, the video game One Hour One Life was released into the public domain.

See also 
 List of countries' copyright lengths
 Public Domain Day
 Creative Commons
 Public Domain
 Over 300 public domain authors available in Wikisource (any language), with descriptions from Wikidata
 1947 in literature, 1957 in literature, 1967 in literature and 1977 in literature

References

External links
 

Public domain
Public domain
2018-related lists